The UNESCO Prize for Peace Education has been awarded annually since 1981. The main goal of UNESCO education prize is to encourage excellent effort in the drive to reach a better quality education. The prize is endowed up to US$60,000 and honours extraordinary activities for peace education in the spirit of the UNESCO constitution.

Recipients of the prize

 2008: Institute for Justice and Reconciliation (South Africa)
 2006: Christopher Gregory Weeramantry (Sri Lanka)
 Honourable mention: Fundación para la Reconciliación (Colombia)
 2003: Emile Shoufani, Greek-Catholic Archimandrite in Nazareth
 2002: City Montessori School, Lucknow, (India)
 2001: Jewish-Arab Centre for Peace Education in Givat Haviva (Israel) and Bishop Nelson Onono Onweng, Uganda
 2000: Australian Peace Educator Toh Swee-Hin
 1999: Asociación Madres de Plaza de Mayo, Buenos Aires, Argentina.
 Honourable mention: Verein für Friedenspädagogik, Tübingen (Germany)
 1998: Educators for Peace and Mutual Understanding (Ukraine)
 Honourable mention: Fridtjof Nansen Academy (Norway), World Court Project (New Zealand), Ulpan Akiva Netanya (Israel)
 1997: Francois Giraud (France)
 1996: Chiara Lubich (Italy)
 1995: Study Center for Peace and Conflict Resolution (Austria)
 1994:  Prayudh Payutto (Thailand)
 1993: Madeleine de Vits (Belgium) and Graduate Institute of Peace Studies at Kyung Hee University (South Korea)
 1992: Mother Teresa
 1991: Ruth Leger Sivard (United States) / Cours Sainte Marie de Hann (Senegal)
 1990: Rigoberta Menchú Tum (Guatemala) / World Order Models Project (WOMP)
 1989: Robert Muller (France) / International Peace Research Association (IPRA)
 1988: Frère Roger,  Taizé (France)
 1987: Laurence Deonna (Switzerland) / "Servicio Paz y Justicia en America Latina"
 1986: Paulo Freire (Brazil)
 1985: Indar Jit Rikhye (India) / Georg-Eckert-Institut für Internationale Schulbuchforschung (Germany)
 1984: IPPNW International Physicians for the Prevention of Nuclear War
 1983: Pax Christi International
 1982: Stockholm International Peace Research Institute (SIPRI)
 1981: Helena Kekkonen (Finland) / World Organization of the Scout Movement

See also
 List of peace activists

External links
 

UNESCO awards
Peace awards
Awards established in 1981